Sarracenia jonesii is a species of pitcher plant discovered by Edgar T. Wherry which is endemic to the bogs in the mountains on the border between North Carolina and South Carolina. It is currently only found in ten locations: 4 in North Carolina and 6 in South Carolina. S. jonesii is listed as endangered by the US federal government.

Description
Sarracenia jonesii has hollow tubular pitchers that are green in color with maroon veins. It is a stemless herbaceous perennial that requires full sunlight to grow. Flowers are usually maroon, 5-petaled and globular and produce a fragrant odor. The pitchers produced are narrow with a horizontal lid to prevent too much rain water from entering the tube. The pitcher attracts flies and other small insects to feed on it, luring them with colorful leaves and sweet smells. The sides of the pitcher are waxy and slippery, which prevents insects from escaping once trapped. The nectar paralyzes the insects and digestive fluids in the tubular leaf decompose the insect which allows the plant to then absorb nutrients. The plant ranges in height from 21–73 cm. The fragrant flowers are borne singly on erect scales from April to June, with seed set occurring in October.

Distribution
Sarracenia jonesii is endemic to North Carolina and South Carolina. It can be found in bogs in the mountainous region on the border of the two states. It favors depression bogs and cataract bogs.

Conservation 
Sarracenia jonesii was listed as an endangered species in the United States due to its extremely limited distribution and because of its vulnerability as a species. Sarracenia jonesii as well as other species of Sarracenia are often collected by enthusiastic plant collectors which furthers many of their statuses as endangered. The U.S. Fish and Wildlife Service has stated that 16 of the 26 previously known locations of S. jonesii have been extirpated from North Carolina and South Carolina.

In 2007, Meadowview Biological Research Station successfully reintroduced two populations of S. jonesii to its historic range in North Carolina to include the Biltmore Estate, under a National Fish and Wildlife Foundation Grant, and Falling Creek Camp for Boys.

Taxonomy
The taxonomic status of S. jonesii has been widely debated in the past. It has been classified as a subspecies of S. rubra, although recent research suggests that it is its own species. The disjunct distribution from other species of S. rubra, differences morphologically, and unique coloration and fragrance from other subspecies of S. rubra suggest that it has adapted to suit different insects within its environment. Such changes constitute a speciation event, thus granting S. jonesii species status. Sarracenia jonesii was separated from the S. rubra complex by Case and Case, and isozyme studies conducted by Godt and Hamrick also support species status of S. jonesii.

References

jonesii
Carnivorous plants of North America
Endemic flora of the United States
Flora of North Carolina
Flora of South Carolina
Endangered flora of the United States